Garimella (Telugu: గరిమెళ్ళ) is one of the Telugu Brahmin & Chowdary surnames.
 Garimella Satyanarayana, is a Poet and Freedom Fighter of Andhra Pradesh, India. 
 Garimella Balakrishna Prasad, is an Indian classical devotional singer and composer.
 Garimella Prathyusha, is a fashion designer in Telangana, Hyderabad.

Indian surnames